The 1939–40 Lancashire Cup was the thirty-second occasion on which the Lancashire Cup completion had been held. Due to the start of the Second World War, the competition was delayed until early 1940. Swinton won the trophy  by beating Widnes on a two legged final by the score of 21-15 aggregate.

The first leg was played at Naughton Park, Widnes, and the second led was played at Station Road, Swinton.

Swinton won both legs, 5-4 away and 16-11 at home.

The attendances were 5,500 at Widnes and  9,000 at Swinton.

Preamble to changes 
Prior to the declaration of war on 3 September 1939, most clubs had played two or three fixtures (on Saturday 26, Thursday 31 August and Saturday 2 September).

During the following week, the Northern Rugby League decided, after publicity from the Government, to suspend the championship. They almost immediately inaugurated two regional (Lancashire and Yorkshire), Wartime Emergency Leagues, with the winner of each league meeting in a play-off final to decide the overall winner.

The Challenge Cup and both County Cups were suspended. There was to be no Lancashire Cup competition in 1939.

But later in the season both County Cups were resurrected.

The Lancashire Cup started on Saturday 2 March 1940 and was played on consecutive weekends.

Each and every match was played on a two-legged home and away basis.

Background 
St Helens Recs had already withdrawn from the league immediately after the end on the 1938-39 season. The club had been struggling to survive for a few years with falling attendances and the economic depression and it was obviously not possible for the town to sustain two top teams.

The number of teams entering this year's competition decreased by one with the loss of St Helens Recs to a total of 12.

The same fixture format was retained. This season saw no byes but two “blank” or “dummy” fixture in the first round. The second round now had two byes.

The whole competition was played on the basis of two legged ties.

Competition and results

Round 1 – First Leg  
Involved  6 matches (with two “blank” fixture) and 12 clubs

Round 1 – Second  Leg  
Involved  6 matches (with two “blank” fixture) and 12 clubs. The reverse fixtures of the first leg

Round 2 – quarterfinals – First Leg  
Involved 2 matches (with two) and 6 clubs

Round 2 – quarterfinals –Second Leg  
Involved 2 matches (with two) and 6 clubs. The reverse fixtures of the first leg

Round 3 – semifinals – First Legs  
Involved 2 matches and 4 clubs

Round 3 – semifinals – Second Legs  
Involved 2 matches and 4 clubs. The reverse fixtures of the first leg

Final – First Leg

Final – Second Leg 
The reverse fixture of the first leg

Teams and scorers 

Scoring - Try = three (3) points - Goal = two (2) points - Drop goal = two (2) points

The road to success 
ALL ties were played on a two leg (home and away) basis

The first club named in each tie played the first leg at home

The scores shown are the aggregate score over the two legs

Notes and comments 
This would be the last year of the Lancashire Cup until season 1945-46.

In the in-between years, many Lancashire clubs were invited (and accepted the invitation) to take part in the Yorkshire Cup competition.

See also 
1939–40 Northern Rugby Football League Wartime Emergency League season
Rugby league county cups

References

External links
Saints Heritage Society
1896–97 Northern Rugby Football Union season at wigan.rlfans.com
Hull&Proud Fixtures & Results 1896/1897
Widnes Vikings - One team, one passion Season In Review - 1896-97
The Northern Union at warringtonwolves.org

RFL Lancashire Cup
Lancashire Cup